Nathan "Nate" Watkins is a retired American soccer player who played professionally in the USL A-League.

Watkins attended the University of South Carolina, playing on the men’s soccer team from 1995 to 1998.  In 1999, Watkins signed with the Charlotte Eagles.  In 2001, the Eagles moved up to the USL A-League. In 2000 and 2005, the Eagles won the league championship.  Watkins final season with Charlotte came in 2005.

References

Living people
1977 births
American soccer players
Charlotte Eagles players
South Carolina Gamecocks men's soccer players
A-League (1995–2004) players
USL Second Division players
Association football defenders
Association football midfielders